Études is French for "studies". It is used as a name for several music or dance works, including:
 Études (Chopin), three sets of studies for the piano by Frédéric Chopin, composed between 1829 and 1839
 Études (Debussy), a set of 12 piano études composed in 1915 by Claude Debussy
 Études (ballet), a 1948 ballet by Harald Lander
 Études (Ligeti), 18 piano studies composed between 1985 and 2001 by György Ligeti
 Alexander Scriabin: twenty-six études (Opp. 2, 8, 42, 49, 56 and 65)
 Etudes (Charlie Haden album)
 Etudes (Ron Carter album)

A number of musical works include the word Études in their title:
 Trois Nouvelles Études for piano written by Frédéric Chopin in 1839 
 Trois Études de concert, a set of three piano études by Franz Liszt, composed between 1845 and 1849
 Grandes Études de Paganini, a series of six études for the piano by Franz Liszt, in 1851
 Études d'exécution transcendante, a series of twelve compositions for solo piano by Franz Liszt in 1852
 Études-Tableaux (disambiguation), two sets of piano études composed in 1911 by Sergei Rachmaninoff
 Études australes and Études boréales, two sets of études for cello and/or piano composed by John Cage between 1974 and 1978
 Études transcendantales, a song cycle in 9 movements for mezzo-soprano and chamber ensemble composed by Brian Ferneyhough between 1982 and 1985

The word Études also appears in the academic world:
 Études (journal)
 École pratique des hautes études, a prestigious research and higher education institution in France
 Institut des hautes études scientifiques, a French institute supporting advanced research in mathematics and theoretical physics, located in Bures-sur-Yvette just south of Paris
 Hautes Études Commerciales (disambiguation) is the name of prestigious business schools in France, Switzerland, Belgium, Canada, etc.
 Études celtiques, a French academic journal of Celtic Studies, based in Paris, founded in 1870
 Revue des études juives, a French quarterly of Jewish studies, founded in 1880

See also 
 Étude, the musical form
 Étude (instrumental), a single by Mike Oldfield
 The Etude, a defunct American music magazine
 List of étude composers,